Alfred Anthony may refer to:

 Alfred W. Anthony (1860–1939), American author, Freewill Baptist leader and religion professor
 Alfred Anthony (cricketer) (1841–1900), English cricketer